Daniel Francis McComas (born May 26, 1953, in San Juan, Puerto Rico) has served as a  Republican member of the North Carolina General Assembly's North Carolina House of Representatives representing the state's nineteenth House district in New Hanover County. After nine terms in the state House, McComas announced that he would not seek re-election in 2012. Then, he resigned before the end of his final term to accept Gov. Beverly Perdue's appointment as chairman of the North Carolina Ports Authority. In that post, he succeeded another former state legislator, Carl J. Stewart, Jr.

A business executive from Wilmington, McComas was the first Hispanic member of the North Carolina General Assembly in 1995. He is a graduate of St. Bonaventure University in New York. In 1998, he received the Razor Walker Award from the University of North Carolina at Wilmington School of Education.

He is the owner and president of MCO Transport, a shipping company based in Wilmington, North Carolina.

References

External links
General Assembly homepage
Campaign website

|-

Living people
1953 births
Politicians from Wilmington, North Carolina
Members of the North Carolina House of Representatives
21st-century American politicians